Oak Orchard Creek (sometimes called Oak Orchard River) is a tributary of Lake Ontario in Orleans County, New York in the United States.

The creek flows through Oak Orchard Creek Marsh,  of which were declared a National Natural Landmark in May 1973. The marshlands through which Oak Orchard Creek flows are a major stopover points for migratory birds, and are protected by state- and federally-designated conservation areas.

Course

Oak Orchard Creek rises south of Oak Orchard Creek Marsh (also called the "Alabama Swamp") at the border of Orleans and Genesee counties. The swamp contains a state reserve, Oak Orchard Wildlife Management Area, and a national reserve, the Iroquois National Wildlife Refuge, both of which are known as major stopover points for migratory birds. Oak Orchard Creek Marsh was designated a National Natural Landmark in May 1973.  The swamp is a result of a partial blockage of the river by glacial drift and an outcrop of limestone and dolomite known as the Lockport Formation which forms the Niagara Escarpment.

After flowing through the swamp, it flows northward, across the escarpment in a series of waterfalls and rapids at Shelby Center, thence passing through the Village of Medina to the small Glenwood Lake north of the village. The creek departs the town of Ridgeway at its northeast corner, cuts through the northwest corner of the town of Gaines, and widens before entering the town of Carlton. The widest part is now known as Waterport Pond (Lake Alice), and the hamlet of Waterport is on the south bank. A dam at the northeast end of the pond controls water flow.

Oak Orchard Creek narrows again and passes underneath Route 18 and the Lake Ontario State Parkway before entering Lake Ontario at Point Breeze where Oak Orchard State Marine Park is located. The lower part of the creek remains relatively ice-free during winters presumably due to steady flow of water and hydro-plant at Waterport.

Sporting activities

Boating 
Several boat launch locations exist in the lower Oak Orchard Creek. Two are near Point Breeze at the state park. Three more are near the Route 18 overpass. Boating is limited to a short distance upstream from a point called Toms Landing due to the shallow depth. Most boaters enter the creek in order to fish.

There is some concern about pollutants from anti-fouling paint on boat hulls.

Fishing
The state fish hatcheries release brown trout, salmon and steelhead each year into the river. Fishing may be done from boats in the lower part, by wading in the upper parts, and from the shore along its length.

Other activities
The entire area of public lands is open for birdwatching and hiking. Within the Oak Orchard Swamp other activities, such as hunting and trapping, can be done by permit. Boating is restricted to non-powered boats, and picnicking and camping are restricted to specific areas.

See also
List of rivers of New York
List of National Natural Landmarks in New York

References

External links

National Natural Landmarks in New York (state)
Rivers of New York (state)
Rivers of Genesee County, New York
Rivers of Orleans County, New York
Tributaries of Lake Ontario